Recording Industry Association Singapore (RIAS) is an organisation that represents the music industry in Singapore and national representative of the International Federation of the Phonographic Industry. The organisation was founded in 1976 as the Singapore Phonogram Videogram Association (SPVA) and renamed in 2001.

Sales certificates 
RIAS awards certificates for music records in Singapore based on sales. The requirements from album awards varied over the years, while the requirements for singles stayed constant. The levels are:

, RIAS also accepts digital sales.

Charts 
RIAS runs the following weekly charts:

 Top Streaming Chart
 Top Regional Chart

Number-one songs 
The first number-one song of the RIAS Charts was "Perfect" by Ed Sheeran on January 4, 2018. No charts were released between March 28 and June 28, 2019. As of the issue for the week ending July 1, 2021, the RIAS Charts has had 52 different number-one songs.

List of number-one songs of 2018 (Singapore)
List of number-one songs of 2019 (Singapore)
List of number-one songs of 2020 (Singapore)
List of number-one songs of 2021 (Singapore)
List of number-one songs of 2022 (Singapore)
List of number-one songs of 2023 (Singapore)

Song milestones

Most weeks at number one

Artist milestones

Most number-one songs

Most weeks at number one

References

External links 
 

Organizations established in 1976
Music organisations based in Singapore
Music industry associations
1976 establishments in Singapore